NCI-designated Cancer Centers are a group of 71 cancer research institutions in the United States supported by the National Cancer Institute.

Program 
Three designations are recognized: Comprehensive Cancer Centers, Clinical Cancer Centers, and Basic Laboratory Cancer Centers.  As of 2023, there are 53 Comprehensive Cancer Centers, 11 Clinical Cancer Centers, and 7 Basic Laboratory Cancer Centers. Almost all are associated with a university. Receiving the NCI-designation places cancer centers among the top 4 percent of the approximately 1,500 cancer centers in the United States.

The standards for Comprehensive Cancer Centers are the most restrictive of the types. These facilities must demonstrate expertise in each of three areas: laboratory, clinical, and behavioral and population-based research. Comprehensive Cancer Centers are expected to initiate and conduct early phase, innovative clinical trials and to participate in the NCI's cooperative groups by providing leadership and recruiting patients for trials. Comprehensive Cancer Centers must also conduct activities in outreach and education, and provide information on advances in healthcare for both healthcare professionals and the public. Comprehensive cancer centers may apply for up to $1.5 million per year from the Department of Health and Human Services. 

Clinical Cancer Centers generally conduct a combination of basic, population sciences, and clinical research, and are encouraged to stimulate collaborative research involving more than one field of study. Clinical cancer centers may apply for up to $1.4 million per year. 

Basic Laboratory Cancer Centers conduct only laboratory research and do not provide patient treatment. Basic Laboratory Cancer Centers are more often affiliated with research institutes rather than universities. They are eligible to apply for up to $1.2 million per year. 

Independent or freestanding cancer centers are entities unto themselves and are not considered to be part of a larger institution or university. The center’s administration controls all space, appointments, and budgets. These institutions may have university affiliations, but they remain administratively and financially distinct. 

The NCI also supports Consortium Centers, wherein scientists and clinicians from multiple institutions enter into formal agreements to expand cancer research programs.

These grants fund shared resources to further the goals of the National Cancer Institute. Some of these include the administration of cancer research programs, training activities, core facilities with technology shared by investigators, and clinical trial management services.

In 2015, more than 353,000 new patients were enrolled in a clinical trial at an NCI-designated Cancer Center.

Designation process 
Cancer centers must renew their status with the NIH every 5 years. The NIH funds cancer centers through a P30 Cancer Center Support Grant (CCSG) mechanism. To be eligible to apply, a cancer center must receive at least $10 million in cancer research funding annually. Preparation for these grant applications can be extensive. The most recent grant application prepared by MD Anderson Cancer Center took 24 months to prepare and ran to 2,963 pages.

The NCI considers the certain characteristics essential to a cancer center, and requires that applications address the institutions' resources in the areas of: Physical Space, Organizational Capabilities, Transdisciplinary Collaboration and Coordination, Cancer Focus, Institutional Commitment, Center Director.

List of centers

Comprehensive cancer centers

Alabama (1): O'Neal Comprehensive Cancer Center at the University of Alabama at Birmingham
Arizona (1): The University of Arizona Cancer Center at the University of Arizona (Tucson)
California (8):
Chao Family Comprehensive Cancer Center at the University of California, Irvine
City of Hope National Medical Center (Duarte) (independent)
UCLA Jonsson Comprehensive Cancer Center at the University of California, Los Angeles
UC San Diego Moores Cancer Center at University of California, San Diego
UCSF Helen Diller Family Comprehensive Cancer Center at the University of California, San Francisco
UC Davis Comprehensive Cancer Center at the University of California, Davis (Sacramento)
USC Norris Comprehensive Cancer Center at the University of Southern California (Los Angeles)
Stanford Cancer Institute at Stanford University (Stanford, CA)
Colorado (1): University of Colorado Cancer Center at the University of Colorado (Aurora)
Connecticut (1): Yale Cancer Center at Yale University School of Medicine (New Haven)
District of Columbia (1): Georgetown Lombardi Comprehensive Cancer Center at Georgetown University (Washington), in association with John Theurer Cancer Center at Hackensack University Medical Center (NJ)
Florida (1): 
Moffitt Cancer Center at the University of South Florida (Tampa)
Georgia (1): Winship Cancer Institute of Emory University (Atlanta)
Illinois (2):
University of Chicago Comprehensive Cancer Center (Chicago)Robert H. Lurie Comprehensive Cancer Center at Northwestern University (Chicago)Indiana (1): Indiana University Cancer Center (Indianapolis)Iowa (1): Holden Comprehensive Cancer Center at University of Iowa (Iowa City)Kansas (1):  University of Kansas Cancer Center at the University of Kansas (Kansas City)Maryland (2): 
Sidney Kimmel Comprehensive Cancer Center at Johns Hopkins Medicine (Baltimore)
University of Maryland Greenebaum Cancer Center (Baltimore)Massachusetts (1): Dana-Farber/Harvard Cancer Center (Boston)Michigan (2):
Barbara Ann Karmanos Cancer Institute (Detroit)  
University of Michigan Rogel Cancer Center (Ann Arbor)Minnesota (2):
Mayo Clinic Cancer Center (Rochester) (independent)
Masonic Cancer Center at the University of Minnesota (Minneapolis)Missouri (1): Alvin J. Siteman Cancer Center at Barnes-Jewish Hospital and Washington University School of Medicine (St. Louis)New Hampshire (1): Norris Cotton Cancer Center of Dartmouth-Hitchcock Medical Center (Lebanon)New Jersey (2): 
Cancer Institute of New Jersey at Rutgers (New Brunswick)
John Theurer Cancer Center (Hackensack) New Mexico (1): University of New Mexico Comprehensive Cancer Center at the University of New Mexico (Albuquerque)New York (4):
Herbert Irving Comprehensive Cancer Center of New York-Presbyterian Hospital and Columbia University Medical Center (New York)
Memorial Sloan-Kettering Cancer Center (New York) (independent)
Laura and Isaac Perlmutter Cancer Center at NYU Langone Health (New York)
Roswell Park Comprehensive Cancer Center (Buffalo) (independent)North Carolina (3):
 Wake Forest Comprehensive Cancer Center of Wake Forest University (Winston-Salem)
 Duke Cancer Institute at Duke University (Durham)
 Lineberger Comprehensive Cancer Center at UNC (Chapel Hill)Ohio (2):
Case Comprehensive Cancer Center (Case Western Reserve University, University Hospitals Seidman Cancer Center, & Cleveland Clinic Taussig Cancer Institute) (Cleveland)
The Arthur G. James Cancer Hospital & Richard J. Solove Research Institute at Ohio State University (Columbus)
 Oregon (1): Knight Cancer Institute at Oregon Health & Science University (Portland)Pennsylvania (3):
Abramson Cancer Center at the University of Pennsylvania (Philadelphia)
Fox Chase Cancer Center at Temple University (Philadelphia)
UPMC Hillman Cancer Center at the University of Pittsburgh (Pittsburgh)Tennessee (2): 
Vanderbilt-Ingram Cancer Center at Vanderbilt University (Nashville)
St. Jude Children's Research Hospital (Memphis) (independent)Texas (3):
 Dan L Duncan Cancer Center at Baylor College of Medicine (Houston)
 Harold C. Simmons Cancer Center at University of Texas Southwestern Medical Center (Dallas)
 The University of Texas MD Anderson Cancer Center (Houston) (independent)Utah (1): Huntsman Cancer Institute at the University of Utah (Salt Lake City)
University of Virginia Cancer Center (Charlottesville)Washington (1): Fred Hutchinson Cancer Research Center (Seattle) Wisconsin (1): University of Wisconsin Carbone Cancer Center at the University of Wisconsin Hospitals and Clinics (Madison)

 Clinical Cancer Centers Florida (1): Sylvester Comprehensive Cancer Center of the Leonard M. Miller School of Medicine at the University of Miami (Miami)Hawaii (1): University of Hawaii Cancer Center (Honolulu)
 Kentucky (1): Markey Cancer Center at the University of Kentucky (Lexington)Nebraska (1): University of Nebraska Medical Center Fred & Pamela Buffett Cancer Center (Omaha)New York (2):
Albert Einstein Cancer Center at the Albert Einstein College of Medicine (Bronx)
Tisch Cancer Institute at Mount Sinai Health System (New York)
 Oklahoma (1): Stephenson Cancer Center at University of Oklahoma Health Sciences Center (Oklahoma City)Pennsylvania (1): Sidney Kimmel Cancer Center at Thomas Jefferson University Hospital (Philadelphia)South Carolina (1): Medical University of South Carolina's Hollings Cancer CenterTexas (1): UT Health San Antonio Cancer Center of the University of Texas Health Science Center at San AntonioVirginia (2):
Massey Cancer Center of Virginia Commonwealth University (Richmond)

 Basic laboratory cancer centers 
 California (2):
 Sanford Burnham Prebys Medical Discovery Institute (La Jolla) (independent)
 Salk Institute for Biological Studies (La Jolla)  (independent)
 Indiana (1): Purdue Cancer Center (West Lafayette)Massachusetts (1): David H. Koch Institute for Integrative Cancer Research at MIT (Cambridge) Maine (1): Jackson Laboratory (Bar Harbor, Maine, and Farmington, Connecticut) (independent)
 New York (1): Cold Spring Harbor Laboratory (Cold Spring Harbor) (independent)
 Pennsylvania''' (1): Wistar Institute (Philadelphia)

References

External links
Find an NCI-designated Cancer Center

National Cancer Institute-designated Cancer Center
Cancer Center